Callona rimosa is a species of beetle in the family Cerambycidae. It was described by Buquet in 1940.

References

Callona
Beetles described in 1940